Lapinlahti (also ) is a municipality of Finland. The municipality is unilingually Finnish.

The neighboring municipalities of Lapinlahti are Iisalmi, Kuopio, Rautavaara, Siilinjärvi and Sonkajärvi. The neighboring municipality of Varpaisjärvi was consolidated with Lapinlahti on January 1, 2011.

There are a total of 229 lakes in the municipality of Lapinlahti, the largest of which include Lake Onkivesi.

References

External links

Municipality of Lapinlahti – Official website

 
Populated places established in 1874
1874 establishments in Finland